Dietmar Köster (born 6 January 1957) is a German politician, social scientist and Member of the European Parliament (MEP) representing Germany since July 2014. He is a member of the Social Democratic Party, part of the Party of European Socialists.

Education and academic career
In 1983 Köster graduated from the Ruhr University Bochum with a degree in social science. He subsequently obtained a doctorate in 2002. From 2002 until 2011 he served as a Director of the Geragogik e.V. Research Institute. Since 2012 he has been a professor at the Dortmund Vocational College.

Parliamentary service
Member, Committee on Civil Liberties, Justice and Home Affairs (2017–)
Member, Committee of Inquiry to investigate alleged contraventions and maladministration in the application of Union law in relation to money laundering, tax avoidance and tax evasion (2016–)
Member, Delegation for relations with the United States (2014–)
Member, Committee on Legal Affairs (2014–2017)

In addition to his committee assignments, Köster serves as a member of the European Parliament Intergroup on Anti-Racism and Diversity, the European Parliament Intergroup on Western Sahara and of the European Parliament Intergroup on LGBT Rights.

Other activities
 German United Services Trade Union (ver.di), Member

References

Living people
1957 births
German social scientists
Social Democratic Party of Germany MEPs
MEPs for Germany 2014–2019
MEPs for Germany 2019–2024
People from Schwerte
Ruhr University Bochum alumni